is a fishing video game developed and released only in Japan for the Super Famicom on February 21, 1997 and updated for broadcast as eight different episodes on the Satellaview subsystem between April and November 1997. The game allows the player to play as the creator of the game, Shigesato Itoi, and includes a host of animal characters who occasionally appear in the game. The SA-1 was used in the Super Famicom version.

Gameplay 

Itoi Shigesato no Bass Tsuri No. 1 is set on the fictional  where the BAC (Bass Angler's Club) catch fish and compete in tournaments. There are several types of fish and there is a size-range within each type. The goal of the player is to catch the most and the largest fish possible as to compete in extra competitions such as quizzes. In order to have the greatest success in fishing, players must determine the most fruitful part of Lake Akahoshi given the weather conditions and the time of the day. The player is also able to select from a number of different lures that can be used to attract different species and different sizes of fish. The most sought-after fish in the game is the "over 80cm bass."

Ports and related releases 
In January 1997, Nintendo in collaboration with St.GIGA held a series of multiplayer contests allowing players of the Satellaview version of the game to compete on a national scale. Itoi himself participated in this event. The Satellaview competition event was divided into two divisions. The top 10 best scores from the General Division as well as the top 20 best scores in the Knockout Division would win a collectible Bass Tsuri No.1-exclusive prize Lure. Each Lure was hand-painted and these prizes have become collectors items since the demise of the Satellaview. This competition proved highly successful and its popularity prompted Nintendo and St.GIGA to run a second competition between April 27 and May 3, 1997.

In 2000, a Definitive Edition was developed and published for N64. A few changes have been made to give players a more in-depth playing experience. As such, support for a tackle-and-reel peripheral has been included to heighten gameplay realism. Force-feedback features have also been included to allow the controller (standard controller or tackle-and-reel) to vibrate realistically when a fish has been "hooked." Between March 31 and May 31, 2000, another competition was launched by Nintendo in collaboration with Famitsu magazine to promote the Definitive Edition of the game. Winners of this competition could win a free reel-and-tackle controllers, original Bass Tsuri No.1-exclusive prize clothing, etc. By sending away for it, a select number of players could also win Bass Tsuri No.1-exclusive prize Lures. Japanese comedian Takashi Fujii starred in television commercials for the game.

Reception
Famitsu magazine rated the Definitive Edition for the Nintendo 64 a 30 out of 40.

References

External links
 Official web page (Super Famicom version) (Original)(Translated using Excite.Co.Jp)
 Official web page (N64 version) (Original)(Translated using Excite.Co.Jp)
 A series of interviews with Shigesato Itoi and other Bass Tsuri No. 1 developers from Itoi's personal website

1997 video games
Episodic video games
Fishing video games
HAL Laboratory games
Japan-exclusive video games
Nintendo 64 games
Nintendo games
Satellaview games
Super Nintendo Entertainment System games
Video games developed in Japan